Alena Popova (born ) is a Kazakhstani female volleyball player. She is part of the Kazakhstan women's national volleyball team.

She participated in the 2015 FIVB Volleyball World Grand Prix.
On club level she played for Karaganda in 2015.

References

External links

1997 births
Living people
Kazakhstani women's volleyball players
Place of birth missing (living people)